Myasthenia is a medical term for muscle weakness. The term may also refer to:

Medical conditions
 Myasthenia gravis
 Ocular myasthenia
 Lambert–Eaton myasthenic syndrome